Mic or Mik is a given name, nickname, and surname. It may refer to:

People with the given name 

 Mic Conway (born 1951), Australian vocalist
 Mic Gillette (1951–2016), American brass player
 Mic Jordan, American rapper and activist
 Mic Looby (born 1969), Australian author and illustrator
 Mic Sokoli (1839–1881), Albanian nationalist figure and guerrilla fighter

People with the nickname 

 Mic Christopher (1969–2001), American-Irish singer-songwriter
 Mic Geronimo (born 1973), American hip-hop rapper
 Mic Michaeli (born 1962), Swedish keyboardist
 Mic Murphy (born 1958), American musician

People with the surname 

 Ouk Mic (born 1980), Cambodian footballer

See also 

 Mick
 Michael

Lists of people by nickname